DYIB (96.1 FM), on-air as 96.1 The Voice FM, is a radio station owned and operated by Iddes Broadcast Group. The station's studio and transmitter are located at Brgy. 2, Tanjay. It operates daily from 5:00 AM to 10:00 PM.

Programming
DYIB 96.1's weekday schedule features two locally-produced news and talk programs: The Voice NegOr Balita in morning primetime and Ronda Balita in the early evening. Music and entertainment programming fill the remainder of the broadcast day, as well as some blocktimers. Top-of-the-hour news reports are broadcast twice an hour in the mid-morning, featuring local, national and world headlines. It airs selected programs from Power 102.1 RFM based in Mabinay.

Weekends primarily feature music and entertainment programs and a few blocktime shows, save for an hour-long block of Christian music followed by a religious talk program, Alarma Tirada, on Sunday nights.

References

External links
 Facebook page

Radio stations in Negros Oriental
Radio stations established in 2019
2019 establishments in the Philippines